Eglinton can refer to:

People 
Earl of Eglinton, a title in the Peerage of Scotland
Geoffrey Eglinton (1927–2016), British chemist
Timothy Eglinton, a British biogeoscientist
William Eglinton (1857–1933), a British spiritualist medium and fraud
J.Z. Eglinton, pseudonym of Walter H. Breen Jr. (1928–1993)
John Eglinton, pseudonym of William Kirkpatrick Magee (1868–1961)

Places

Australia
Eglinton, New South Wales, a suburb of Bathurst
Eglinton, Western Australia, a suburb of Perth

Canada

Toronto
Eglinton, Ontario, a former village now in Toronto
Eglinton (electoral district), a former federal electoral district
Eglinton (provincial electoral district), a former provincial electoral district
Eglinton Avenue, a main thoroughfare in Toronto
Eglinton Park
Eglinton Theatre
Line 5 Eglinton or Eglinton Crosstown Line, a light rail line under construction
Eglinton Maintenance and Storage Facility, a light-rail facility serving Line 5 Eglinton

Canadian Territories
Eglinton Island, Northwest Territories, one of the Queen Elizabeth Islands in the Canadian Arctic
Cape Eglinton, a land point on eastern Baffin Island, Canada
Eglinton Fiord

New Zealand
Eglinton River

United Kingdom
Eglinton, County Londonderry, a village in Northern Ireland
City of Derry Airport, known as Eglinton airport, and formerly RAF Eglinton
RAF Eglinton/RNAS Eglinton, a former Royal Naval Air Station
Eglinton Country Park, North Ayrshire, Scotland
Eglinton Castle
Eglinton Loch

Other uses
, the name of two Royal Navy ships

See also 
Eglinton coupling, a chemical reaction
Eglinton reaction, a chemical reaction
Eglinton station (disambiguation)

Eglington (disambiguation)